Cueto is a Spanish surname. Notable people with the surname include:

Al Cueto, former basketball player
Alonso Cueto, novelist and playwright
Anderson Cueto, football player
César Cueto, football player
Emilio Cueto, guitarist
Germán Cueto, Mexican painter, sculptor, puppet designer and puppeteer
Johnny Cueto (born 1986), Dominican baseball pitcher
Lola Cueto, Mexican painter, printmaker, puppet designer and puppeteer
Mark Cueto (born 1979), English rugby player
Matanza Cueto (born 1982), ring name of American professional wrestler Jeffrey Cobb
Mireya Cueto (1922–2013), Mexican puppeteer, writer and dramaturg

Fictional characters with the surname include:
 Dario and Antonio Cueto, putative owners and promoters of the professional wrestling promotion Lucha Underground (Dario 2014–2017, Antonio 2018–). In storyline, Antonio is the father of Dario and Matanza Cueto.

Spanish-language surnames